Astrid Gabrielsson (born July 27 1989 in Gothenburg, Sweden) is a Swedish sports sailor. At the 2012 Summer Olympics, she competed in the Women's 470 class with Lisa Ericson.

In 2008, Gabrielsson and Ericson won bronze in the junior 470 world championships.

References

Swedish female sailors (sport)
Living people
Olympic sailors of Sweden
Sailors at the 2012 Summer Olympics – 470

1989 births
Sportspeople from Gothenburg